Lessona is a comune (municipality) in the Province of Biella in the Italian region Piedmont, located about  northeast of Turin and about  east of Biella.

Lessona borders the following municipalities: Casapinta, Castelletto Cervo, Cossato, Crosa, Masserano, Mottalciata.

Lessona it's produced the Lessona wine also a wine of great quality, vinified since the 12th century.

Demographic evolution

References

Cities and towns in Piedmont